George Edward Shea (July 4, 1851 – September 13, 1932) was a Newfoundland politician who served as the first mayor of St. John's, Newfoundland (present-day Newfoundland and Labrador, Canada).

The son of Gertrude Corbett and Edward D. Shea, he was born in St. John's and was educated there and at Ampleforth College in England.  He was married twice: first to Louisa Catherine Pinsent in 1888 and then to Margaret Rendell in 1900.

In 1870, Shea became a clerk in the family business, Shea and Company.  The company was shipping agent for the Allan Line of Royal Mail Steamships and the Ross Steamship Line.  In 1887, when his uncle Ambrose Shea was appointed governor of the Bahamas, George replaced him as the firm's managing partner. He was later an agent for the North British Mercantile Insurance Company and a member of the Newfoundland Board of Revenue.

In 1885, Shea ran for the Ferryland seat in the Newfoundland assembly as a Liberal; his father had also represented Ferryland in the assembly. He was elected by acclamation as a supporter of Ambrose Shea, who led the Catholic-Liberal party in a highly sectarian contest. Shea was re-elected as an independent in 1889, but was defeated by Liberal candidates Michael Cashin and Daniel J. Greene in 1893. Again elected to the Newfoundland assembly for Ferryland in 1897, Shea served for two years as minister without portfolio in the government of Sir James Spearman Winter. He did not run for reelection to the assembly in 1900. In 1902 Shea was elected as the first mayor of St. John's. During his term, he improved the water system and helped bring the city's finances under control. Shea served as mayor until 1906, when he was defeated by lawyer Michael Gibbs.

He had meanwhile re-entered the House of Assembly in 1904 as the Liberal representative for the district of St. John's East. He served as minister without portfolio in the government of Sir Robert Bond from 1904 to 1909 and was re-elected in 1908 and 1909.  After Bond decided against a return to politics in 1917 and 1918, Shea endorsed Richard Squires and the Liberal Reform Party. Shea retired from business in 1919 and the following year was appointed by Squires to the Legislative Council.  He occasionally served as acting prime minister in Squire's absence.

He also served on the board of governors of the Newfoundland Savings Bank and as chair of the  Permanent Marine Disasters Fund Committee.

Shea died in St. John's at the age of 81.

References 

1851 births
Members of the Legislative Council of Newfoundland
Mayors of St. John's, Newfoundland and Labrador
1932 deaths
People educated at Ampleforth College
Newfoundland People's Party politicians
Newfoundland Colony people
Government ministers of the Dominion of Newfoundland